is the fifth president of Toyohashi University of Technology. He received his Ph.D. in electrical engineering at Nagoya University in 1967. He became a professor at the engineering faculty of Toyohashi University of Technology in 1977, the engineering faculty of Nagoya University in 1980, the engineering faculty of University of Tokyo in 1983, and the engineering and science faculty of Meijo University in 2000. In April 2002, he became the president of Toyohashi University of Technology.

He is a member of American Association for Crystal Growth.

Awards 
2002 Yamazaki-Teiichi Prize in Semiconductor & Semiconductor Device

References
学長紹介（西永　頌）：国立大学法人　豊橋技術科学大学 Retrieved on July 5, 2007.

Japanese scientists
Japanese electrical engineers
Living people
Toyohashi University of Technology people
Nagoya University alumni
Year of birth missing (living people)